René Pomerleau, OC (27 April 1904 in Saint-Ferdinand, Quebec – 11 October 1993 in Quebec City) was a mycologist and Plant pathologist whose specialty was fungi and lichens. He received a Bachelor of Agricultural Science from Laval University before an MS at the McGill University and later study at the Sorbonne. In 1972, he was awarded an honorary doctorate from Sir George Williams University, which later became Concordia University. He has been called the "Father of mycology in Canada" and seen as a pioneering plant pathologist. The film La mycolade also had him as the main character.

In 2016, following a major legacy gift, the Acfas created the René-Pomerleau Fund, dedicated to initiatives from the next generation of scientists.

Awards 
1955 Léo-Pariseau Prize
1981 Prix Marie-Victorin

References 

Botanists with author abbreviations
Canadian mycologists
Canadian phytopathologists
People from Centre-du-Québec
McGill University alumni
Université Laval alumni
Academic staff of Université Laval
1904 births
1993 deaths
20th-century Canadian botanists
Officers of the Order of Canada
20th-century agronomists